Happier Than Ever, The World Tour is the sixth concert tour by American singer Billie Eilish, in support of her second studio album Happier Than Ever (2021). The tour commenced on February 3, 2022, in New Orleans, Louisiana, at Smoothie King Center. It will conclude at Little John's Farm in Reading as part of the Reading and Leeds Festivals, on August 27, 2023.

Background 
On May 21, 2021, the tour was announced through a YouTube video posted to her official page. In the short clip, the artist sits alone in the auditorium, while at the end of the visual, the camera points to Eilish's official website. Subsequently, Eilish posted further announcements through other social media pages such as Twitter. The tour uses Ticketmaster's Verified fan program in North America. It initially consisted of 50 dates (32 in North America and 18 in Europe). Tickets sold out quickly, leading to the addition of more dates. A third leg, with locations in Oceania, was also added to the tour. 

Eilish worked with Apple Music to exclusively host a film of one of the concerts, specifically one of her shows at the O2 Arena in London. She billed the film as a way for fans who missed out on tickets to experience the tour for themselves, wanting more people to recognize her for her showmanship live. Eilish previewed the film by sharing performances of two tracks from the album—"Therefore I Am" and "I Didn't Change My Number"—through her YouTube account. An extended cut of the film was also released in limited cinemas worldwide on January 27, 2023.

Concert synopsis
The show begins with strobing lights, white backdrops, whilst Eilish is catapulted from under the stage to perform "Bury a Friend", accompanied by a drummer, Andrew Marshall, and her brother, Finneas, on guitar. It was followed by "slinkier" and "hard-hitting" track "I Didn't Change My Number". Next, she sung "NDA", while the stage projected a street and the monitors were displaying cars swerving, later transitioning to "Therefore I Am", when the screens turned red. The singer proceeded with "hypnotic" rendition of "My Strange Addiction" and "downshifted" version of "Idontwannabeyouanymore". During "You Should See Me in a Crown" performance, Eilish instructed her fans to stay still "like Squid Game".

"Billie Bossa Nova" performance was "turned into a libidinous rager" with backdrops projecting faceless, scantily clad dancing bodies. According to the New York Times Lindsay Zoladz, performance of "Goldwing" was a "kinetic call-and-response number." Later, she follows with "quiter" song "Halley's Comet". Next, Eilish performs "Oxytocin", which also included a fragment of "Copycat". The artist additionally asks fans to get as low as possible, so all of them can jump at once.

To begin the tour's acoustic interlude, Finneas joins Eilish on the stage so that they can perform "Your Power" with guitars. In select concerts, starting with the first night at Manchester on June 7, the two debut the song "TV". Alongside "The 30th", it is part of Eilish's two-track extended play Guitar Songs, released in July 2022. She and Finneas perform "The 30th" in place of "TV" for the first time in the tour's Manila concert; Eilish remarked that "The 30th" was hard to sing for her due to its personal lyrics. When they do not perform "TV" or "The 30th", Finneas returns to the keyboard, leaving Eilish at center stage to sing "Male Fantasy" by herself.

It is followed by "Not My Responsibility" interlude, after which she sugues into "Overheated", during which she is on the crane. After that, the singer performs a mash-up of her earlier songs "Bellyache", "Ocean Eyes", and "Bored". She goes back to the stage, and plays "Getting Older" with home videos of the singer and her family being displayed on the backdrops. For "All the Good Girls Go to Hell", screens present global warming effects on the Earth, such as polar bears on melting ice caps, pollution, oil spills, and wildfires. During the song's chorus they turn from flames to complete red.

Eilish starts an encore with "Everything I Wanted", which has been called "relatively breezy" by Keith Spera of The New Orleans Advocate. She follows it with a performance of "Bad Guy", which sees her jumping around the stage, and confetti shot up from the ceiling. "Happier Than Ever" is the concluding song of the show, where Finneas plays the electric guitar, and Eilish headbangs during the second half of the song.

Set list 
This set list is representative of the show in Pittsburgh on February 8, 2022. It is not intended to represent all concerts for the tour.

"Bury a Friend" 
"I Didn't Change My Number"
"NDA"
"Therefore I Am"
"My Strange Addiction"
"Idontwannabeyouanymore"
"Lovely"
"You Should See Me in a Crown"
"Billie Bossa Nova"
"GOLDWING" 
"Halley's Comet"
"Oxytocin" 
"Ilomilo"
"Your Power" 
"Male Fantasy"
"Not My Responsibility" 
"Overheated"
"Bellyache"
"Ocean Eyes"
"Bored"
"Getting Older"
"Lost Cause"
"When the Party's Over"
"All the Good Girls Go to Hell"
"Everything I Wanted"
"Bad Guy"
"Happier Than Ever"
"Goodbye"

Notes 
Starting on June 7, "TV" and "The 30th" were added to the setlist.

Tour dates

Cancelled dates

Notes

References 

2022 concert tours
2023 concert tours
Billie Eilish concert tours
Concert tours of Europe
Concert tours of North America
Concert tours of Oceania
Concert tours of the United States
Concert tours of Canada
Concert tours of the United Kingdom
Concert tours of Australia